Matthew Thomas Brimson (born 1 December 1970) is a former English cricketer. Brimson, a slow left arm orthodox bowler, played first-class cricket for Leicestershire. 

Born in Plumstead, Brimson played briefly for the Kent Second Eleven (1990–1991) and studied at Durham University, where he represented the university side. He made 66 first-class and 45 List A appearances for Leicestershire, with best bowling figures of 5 wickets from 12 balls. 

He was accused of indecent exposure as part of a prank for a team photograph that appeared in the 2000 edition of Wisden Cricketers' Almanack. The photo escaped the attention of editors, and Brimson avoided any punishment as he had already retired from cricket and gone into teaching by the time the incident came to light.

References

External links

English cricketers
Kent cricketers
Leicestershire cricketers
1970 births
Living people
Alumni of Durham University